Atena Lucana is a town and comune in the province of Salerno in the Campania region of south-western Italy.

History
Atena Lucana is one of the most ancient settlements in the Vallo di Diano, as testified by the presence of prehistoric Megalithic walls. Later it was a Greek trading center, a fortress of the Lucani and a municipium of the Romans. In imperial times it temples dedicated to Jupiter, Cybele, Aesculapius, Hercules, bath, an amphitheatre and, perhaps, a forum.

Around the 9th century it was destroyed by Saracen raiders. Subsequently, it was a fief of different baronial families. In the 19th century much of the population emigrated to North and South America.

Main sights

Church of St. Nicholas (9th century)
Church of Santa Maria Maggiore
Archaeological area of Serrone
Castle 
Megalithic Walls (4th century BC)

Festivals
A popular feast day in Atena Lucana is the feast of San Ciro, which is celebrated the 3rd Sunday of May. The women, to show their devotion carry large pyramids of candles on their heads in a procession. Many of them go barefoot as well to show their devotion or to ask for a healing from the Saint.

Twin towns
 Meliki, Greece

See also
Vallo di Diano

References

Cities and towns in Campania
Localities of Cilento